During the 1970–71 season Hibernian, a football club based in Edinburgh, came twelfth out of 18 clubs in the Scottish First Division, reached the semi-finals of the Scottish Cup and reached the quarter-finals of the Scottish League Cup and Inter-Cities Fairs Cup.

Scottish First Division

Final League table

Scottish League Cup

Group stage

Group 4 final table

Knockout stage

Scottish Cup

Inter-Cities Fairs Cup

See also
List of Hibernian F.C. seasons

References

External links
Hibernian 1970/1971 results and fixtures, Soccerbase

Hibernian F.C. seasons
Hibernian